The 2013–14 season was Crewe Alexandra F.C.'s 90th in the English Football League. They competed in Football League One, the third division of professional football in England, the 2013–14 FA Cup, 2013–14 Football League Cup, and 2013–14 Football League Trophy.

Final league table

Results

Football League One

FA Cup

League Cup

Football League Trophy

First-team squad

Left club during the season

Notes

References

Crewe Alexandra F.C. seasons
Crewe Alexandra